Armand Kali(s)z (October 23, 1882 or 1883 – February 1, 1941) was an American stage and film actor of the silent film and early sound period of the 1930s. Prior to that, he was an actor in vaudeville and on the legitimate stage.

Career 
Born in Warsaw, Poland, Kaliz was a headliner in vaudeville.

He arrived in the United States in September 1907, having sailed from Southampton to New York on the S/S St. Louis. His Broadway debut came in The Hoyden (1907). His other plays on Broadway included The Kiss Burglar (1918) and Spice of 1922 (1922).

He appeared in films such as The Temptress (1926) with actresses such as Greta Garbo, making some 82 film appearances between 1917 and 1941. After 1933, the majority of his small roles in films went uncredited.

Liquor dealing
A United Press article published in 1939 described Kaliz as "one of the leading wholesale liquor dealers in the West." He became involved with the business after the repeal of Prohibition when he was a wine taster for an importer.

Personal life
In April 1910 he married his first wife actress Amelia Stone (1882–1966). In 1931, Kaliz married Madeline Hatch Weiner, an actress from a wealthy family in New York. Kaliz died on February 1, 1941, in Beverly Hills Emergency Hospital, from a heart attack.

Partial filmography

 The Siren (1917) - Armand
 Innocent (1918) - Louis Doucet
 Let's Get a Divorce (1918) - Adhemar
 The Yellow Ticket (1918) - Count Rostov
 The Zero Hour (1918) - Esau Brand
 A Temperamental Wife (1919) - Countt Tosoff de Zoolac
 Yellow Fingers (1926) - De Vries
 The Belle of Broadway (1926) - Count Raoul de Parma
 The Temptress (1926) - Marquis de Torre Bianca
 Josselyn's Wife (1926) - Pierre Marchand
 The Better Way (1926) - Stock Broker
 Wandering Girls (1927) - Maurice Dumond
 Say It with Diamonds (1927) - Armand Armour
 Fast and Furious (1927) - Dupont
 The Stolen Bride (1927) - Baron von Heimburg
 Temptations of a Shop Girl (1927) - André Le Croix
 The Love Mart (1927) - Jean Delicado
 That's My Daddy (1927) - Lucien Van Tassel
 The Wife's Relations (1928) - Clifford Rathburn
 A Woman's Way (1928) - Jean
 The Devil's Cage (1928) - Pierre
 Lingerie (1928) - Jack Van Cleeve
 Noah's Ark (1928) - The Frenchman / Leader of the King's Guard
 Broadway Babies (1929) - Tony Ginetti - the Nightclub Manager (uncredited)
 Twin Beds (1929) - Monty Solari
 Gold Diggers of Broadway (1929) - Barney Barnett
 The Marriage Playground (1929) - Prince Matriano
 The Aviator (1929) - Maj. Jules Gaillard
 The Unholy Three (1930) - Jeweler (uncredited)
 L'Énigmatique Monsieur Parkes (1930) - Malatroff
 Kiss Me Again (1931) - M. Bachegalupé (uncredited)
 Little Caesar (1931) - De Voss
 God's Gift to Women (1931) - Mons. Rancour
 Men of the Sky (1931) - Senor Mendoca
 Sweepstakes (1931) - Maitre D' (uncredited)
 Honeymoon Lane (1931) - King of Bulgravia
 This Modern Age (1931) - André de Graignon (replaced by Albert Conti) (scenes deleted)
 Three Wise Girls (1932) - Andre
 Ex-Lady (1933) - Man Flirting with Iris (uncredited)
Secret Sinners (1933) - Armand Blum
 Design for Living (1933) - Mr. Burton (uncredited)
 Flying Down to Rio (1933) - One of the Three Greeks #3
 Caravan (1934) - Chief of Hussars (uncredited)
 Fashions of 1934 (1934) - Paris Cafe Manager (uncredited)
 The Cat and the Fiddle (1934) - King in Show (uncredited)
 George White's Scandals (1934) - Count Dekker
 Upper World (1934) - Maurice (uncredited)
 Kansas City Princess (1934) - Chez Maurice Headwaiter (uncredited)
 Caravan (1934) - Hussar Colonel (uncredited)
 Lottery Lover (1935) - Frenchman (uncredited)
 Ruggles of Red Gap (1935) - Clothing Salesman (uncredited)
 Here's to Romance (1935) - Andriot
 Diamond Jim (1935) - Jewelry Salesman
 Desire (1936) - Jewelry Clerk (uncredited)
 Champagne Charlie (1936) - Cashier (uncredited)
 The King and the Chorus Girl (1937) - Theatre Manager (uncredited)
 A Star Is Born (1937) - (uncredited)
 Cafe Metropole (1937) - Hotel Manager (uncredited)
 Algiers (1938) - French Police Sergeant (uncredited)
 Battle of Broadway (1938) - Maitre d'Hotel (uncredited)
 A Trip to Paris (1938) - Hotel Manager (uncredited)
 Gold Diggers in Paris (1938) - Stage Manager
 Josette (1938) - Thomas
 I'll Give a Million (1938) - Hotel Manager
 Letter of Introduction (1938) - Jules the Barber (uncredited)
 Vacation from Love (1938) - M. Fumagolly, Divorce Lawyer
 Artists and Models Abroad (1938) - Headwaiter (uncredited)
 Topper Takes a Trip (1938) - Hotel Clerk
 Off the Record (1939) - Chatteau
 The Ice Follies of 1939 (1939) - Count (uncredited)
 Midnight (1939) - Lebon
 For Love or Money (1939) - Nanda
 Chasing Danger (1939) - Arab (uncredited)
 Miracles for Sale (1939) - François (uncredited)
 Ninotchka (1939) - Louis - the Headwaiter (uncredited)
 Remember? (1939) - Marcel
 Brother Orchid (1940) - Frenchman (uncredited)
 Down Argentine Way (1940) - Hotel Manager
 Arise, My Love (1940) - Orchestra Leader (uncredited)
 Bitter Sweet (1940) - Headwaiter (uncredited)
 Ziegfeld Girl (1941) - Pierre - Headwaiter (uncredited)
 Skylark (1941) - Jeweler (uncredited) (final film role)

References

External links

1880s births
1941 deaths
American male film actors
American male silent film actors
Vaudeville performers
French emigrants to the United States
20th-century American male actors
Male actors from Paris